SS George E. Merrick was a Liberty ship built in the United States during World War II. She was named after George E. Merrick, a real estate developer who is best known as the planner and builder of the city of Coral Gables, Florida, in the 1920s, one of the first planned communities in the United States.

Construction
George E. Merrick was laid down on 20 March 1944, under a Maritime Commission (MARCOM) contract, MC hull 2476, by the St. Johns River Shipbuilding Company, Jacksonville, Florida; she was sponsored by Mrs. Louis V. Tallamy, the president of the Ladies Auxiliary for the Harvey Seeds American Legion Post, Miami, and was launched on 4 May 1944.

History
She was allocated to the United States Lines, on 21 May 1944. On 2 December 1947, she was laid up in the Hudson River Reserve Fleet, Jones Point, New York. She was sold for commercial use, 25 January 1951, to Saxson Steamship Co. She was removed from the fleet on 6 March 1951. George E. Merrick was renamed Saxon and remained flagged in the US. Saxon was sold to the Aspin Steamship Co. in 1956. In 1961, she was sold to Guiadoro Cia. Nav., and renamed Panaiga Kounistra and reflagged in Greece. She was scrapped in 1972, in Istanbul.

References

Bibliography

 
 
 
 

 

Liberty ships
Ships built in Jacksonville, Florida
1944 ships
Hudson River Reserve Fleet